Los fenómenos del futbol (English: The Phenomena of Football) is a 1964 Mexican film. It stars Sara García.

It is a sequel to Las Chivas Rayadas where Clavillazo, once became famous playing for CD Guadalajara with his brother, tries to get his chances to play in the World Cup in the Mexican squad while trying to get ends meet with a love interest. He got a position in the World Cup and became more famous by scoring the historic goal that allows Mexico to tie the game with Wales.

External links
 

1964 films
Mexican sports drama films
1960s Spanish-language films
1960s Mexican films